Ryanodine is a poisonous diterpenoid found in the South American plant Ryania speciosa (Salicaceae). It was originally used as an insecticide.

The compound has extremely high affinity to the open-form ryanodine receptor, a group of calcium channels found in skeletal muscle, smooth muscle, and heart muscle cells. It binds with such high affinity to the receptor that it was used as a label for the first purification of that class of ion channels and gave its name to it.

At nanomolar concentrations, ryanodine locks the receptor in a half-open state, whereas it fully closes them at micromolar concentration. The effect of the nanomolar-level binding is that ryanodine causes release of calcium from calcium stores as the sarcoplasmic reticulum in the cytoplasm, leading to massive muscle contractions. The effect of micromolar-level binding is paralysis. This is true for both mammals and insects.

See also 
 Ryanoid, a class of insecticides with the same mechanism of action as ryanodine

References 

 Essential Roles of Intracellular Calcium Release Channels in Muscle, Brain, Metabolism, and Aging Current Molecular Pharmacology vol.8, 2015, pages=206–222, 
 Bertil Hille, Ionic Channels of Excitable Membranes, 2nd edition, Sinauer Associates, Sunderland, MA, 01375, 

Insecticides
Pyrroles
Carboxylate esters
Alcohols
Cyclopentanes
Diterpene alkaloids
Isopropyl compounds
Plant toxins